Dany Locati (born 3 January 1977) is an Italian skeleton racer who competed from 1994 to 2006. She finished ninth in the women's skeleton event at the 2002 Winter Olympics in Salt Lake City.

Locati's best finish at the FIBT World Championships was eighth in the women's skeleton event at Königssee in 2004. She retired after the 2006 Winter Olympics in Turin after not qualifying for them.

References
 2002 women's skeleton results
 FIBT profile
 FISI announcement of Locati's retirement 
 Skeletonsport.com profile

External links
 

1977 births
Italian female skeleton racers
Living people
Skeleton racers at the 2002 Winter Olympics
Olympic skeleton racers of Italy